Tanner Springs Park is a city park in Portland, Oregon's Pearl District.

History
Part of a 1999 Pearl District plan, the park was originally named North Park Square, but was renamed in April 2005. Originally, the park was to be designed by Maya Lin, but concerns about her large sculpture, called "Playground", worried Pearl District residents who did not want another child-friendly park only two blocks from Jamison Square.

Design

Connected to the busy Jamison Square two blocks away by a wooden boardwalk made of ipê, Tanner Springs Park is quiet and naturalistic, designed by Atelier Dreiseitl and GreenWorks PC. Stripping away the industrial cover helped reconnect the neighborhood with the pre-industrial wetlands, especially Tanner Creek, which ran through the area. The New York Times described it as "a sort of cross between an Italian piazza and a weedy urban wetland with lots of benches perched beside gently running streams." The waterscape was designed by architect Herbert Dreiseitl, who spent time perfecting the sound made by the rushing water. The park is planted with tall native grasses, and includes Oregon oak, red alder and bigleaf maple trees, salvaged in the region and planted as mature trees.

The east wall of the park includes an art installation called Artwall, primarily composed of rail tracks recovered from the area placed vertically along the east wall. Portland Terminal Railroad donated the rails, recovered from the region. Some rails date back to 1898. Bullseye Glass, a local glass art company, supplied 99 translucent blue pieces of glass, which are interspersed in the rails. They were painted by Herbert Dreiseitl with scenes of indigenous animals.

Reception

After early damage to the pond's ecosystem, signs were placed to explicitly indicate pets are not allowed.

Some visitors consider the park a waste of money, while others appreciate the serenity that a pocket park can provide in the middle of the city. Still others participate in yoga in the park. 

The park has been called a "beautiful little oasis", and architect Laurie Olin remarked:

I've heard some Portlanders are snippy about Dreiseitl's park, boutique ecology and all that. I like the concept, but I'm not crazy about the proportions, for instance, of the stair-step grass seats. I like the idea of recycling the railroad rails and the sense of memory, but they look nasty and scary and that you're going to hurt yourself. The walkways are too Uncle Wiggly to me, too cutesy. But that's one designer criticizing the other designer's cuffs and pockets. I'm not arguing with the raison d'etre.

References

External links
 

2005 establishments in Oregon
Parks in Portland, Oregon
Pearl District, Portland, Oregon
Protected areas established in 2005
Urban public parks